Hampstead is an area in London, which lies  northwest of Charing Cross, and extends from the A5 road (Roman Watling Street) to Hampstead Heath, a large, hilly expanse of parkland. The area forms the northwest part of the London Borough of Camden, a borough in Inner London which for the purposes of the London Plan is designated as part of Central London.

Hampstead is known for its intellectual, liberal, artistic, musical, and literary associations. It has some of the most expensive housing in the London area. Hampstead has more millionaires within its boundaries than any other area of the United Kingdom.

History

Toponymy
The name comes from the Anglo-Saxon words ham and stede, which means, and is a cognate of, the Modern English "homestead".

To 1900

Early records of Hampstead can be found in a grant by King Ethelred the Unready to the monastery of St. Peter's at Westminster (AD 986), and it is referred to in the Domesday Book (1086) as being in the Middlesex hundred of Ossulstone.

The growth of Hampstead is generally traced back to the 17th century. Trustees of the Well started advertising the medicinal qualities of the chalybeate waters (water impregnated with iron) in 1700.  Although Hampstead Wells was initially most successful and fashionable, its popularity declined in the 1800s due to competition with other fashionable London spas. The spa was demolished in 1882, although a water fountain was left behind.

Hampstead started to expand following the opening of the North London Railway in the 1860s (now the London Overground with passenger services operated by Transport for London), and expanded further after the Charing Cross, Euston & Hampstead Railway opened in 1907 (now part of London Underground's Northern line) and provided fast travel to central London.

Much luxurious housing was created during the 1870s and 1880s, in the area that is now the political ward of Frognal & Fitzjohns. Much of this housing remains to this day.

20th century
In the 20th century, a number of notable buildings were created including:
 Hampstead Underground station (1907), the deepest station on the Underground network
 Isokon building (1932)
 Hillfield Court (1932)
 2 Willow Road (1938)
 Swiss Cottage Central Library (1964)
 Royal Free Hospital (mid-1970s)

Cultural attractions in the area include the Freud Museum, Keats House, Kenwood House, Fenton House, the Isokon building, Burgh House (which also houses Hampstead Museum), and the Camden Arts Centre. The large Victorian Hampstead Town Hall was recently converted and extended as an arts centre.

On 14 August 1975 Hampstead entered the UK Weather Records with the Highest 155-min total rainfall at 169 mm. As of November 2008 this record remains.

The average price of a property in Hampstead was £1.5 million in 2018.

Geography

Hampstead became part of the County of London in 1889 and in 1899 the Metropolitan Borough of Hampstead was formed. The Town Hall on Haverstock Hill, which was also the location of the Register Office, can be seen in newsreel footage of many celebrity civil marriages. In 1965, the metropolitan borough was abolished and its area merged with that of the Metropolitan Borough of Holborn and the Metropolitan Borough of St Pancras to form the modern-day London Borough of Camden.

For some, the area represented by Hampstead today consists principally of the (electoral) wards of Hampstead Town and Frognal & Fitzjohns; others espouse a broader definition, encompassing South Hampstead, Belsize Park and West Hampstead.

Politics

Hampstead is part of the Hampstead and Kilburn constituency, formed at the 2010 general election. It was formerly part of the Hampstead and Highgate constituency.

Since May 2018 the area has been represented on Camden Council by Conservative Party councillors Oliver Cooper, Maria Higson and Stephen Stark.

Hampstead Liberalism
The area has a significant tradition of educated liberal humanism, sometimes referred to (often disparagingly) as "Hampstead Liberalism". In the 1960s, the figure of the Hampstead Liberal was notoriously satirised by Peter Simple of the Daily Telegraph in the character of Lady Dutt-Pauker, an immensely wealthy aristocratic socialist whose Hampstead mansion, Marxmount House, contained an original pair of Bukharin's false teeth on display alongside precious Ming vases, neo-constructivist art, and the complete writings of Stalin. Michael Idov of The New Yorker stated that the community "was the citadel of the moneyed liberal intelligentsia, posh but not stuffy." As applied to an individual, the term "Hampstead Liberal" is not synonymous with "champagne socialist" but carries some of the same connotations. The term is also rather misleading.

As of 2018, the component wards of Hampstead (Swiss Cottage, Frognal and Fitzjohns, Hampstead Town and Belsize) have mixed representation. Hampstead Town and Frognal and Fitzjohns wards elect three Conservative councillors, Swiss Cottage elects three Labour councillors, while Belsize is represented by two Liberal Democrat and one Conservative councillor.

Swiss Cottage is a competitive Conservative and Labour marginal, and Frognal and Fitzjohns is a safe Conservative ward. Hampstead Town (including the area of Hampstead Village and South End Green) has seen a number of tightly fought Conservative and Liberal Democrat contests, and the ward has had mixed representation in recent decades. In the most recent election, the highest scoring candidates for each of the three parties in Belsize were within 200 votes of each other.

Brexit referendum
During the 2016 United Kingdom European Union membership referendum, 75% of voters across the London Borough of Camden voted to remain in the EU. Following the result many commentators used Hampstead as an archetype of the type of area that preferred to remain in the EU. This point was often made in alliterative contrast to poor post-industrial northern towns such as Hartlepool and Hull, that preferred to leave.

Places of interest

Sites
To the north and east of Hampstead, and separating it from Highgate, is London's largest ancient parkland, Hampstead Heath, which includes the well-known and legally-protected view of the London skyline from Parliament Hill. The Heath, a major place for Londoners to walk and "take the air", has three open-air public swimming ponds; one for men, one for women, and one for mixed bathing, which were originally reservoirs for drinking water and the sources of the River Fleet. The bridge pictured is known locally as 'The Red Arches' or 'The Viaduct', built in fruitless anticipation of residential building on the Heath in the 19th century.

Local activities include major open-air concerts on summer Saturday evenings on the slopes below Kenwood House, the FT Weekend Festival, book and poetry readings, fun fairs on the lower reaches of the Heath, period harpsichord recitals at Fenton House, Hampstead Scientific Society and Hampstead Photographic Society.

The largest employer in Hampstead is the Royal Free Hospital, Pond Street, but many small businesses based in the area have international significance. George Martin's AIR recording studios, in converted church premises in Lyndhurst Road, is a current example, as Jim Henson's Creature Shop was before it relocated to California.

The area has some remarkable architecture, such as the Isokon building in Lawn Road, a Grade I listed experiment in collective housing, once home to Agatha Christie, Henry Moore, Ben Nicholson and Walter Gropius. It was recently restored by Notting Hill Housing Trust.

Churches and synagogues
Christ Church – Hampstead Square, NW3 1AB
Heath Street Baptist Church, Heath Street, NW3 1DN
St. Andrew's United Reformed Church, Frognal Lane, NW3 7DY
St John-at-Hampstead – Church Row, NW3 6UU
St John's Downshire Hill – Downshire Hill, NW3 1NU
St Luke's – Kidderpore Avenue, NW3 7SU
St Mary's Church (Roman Catholic)– 4 Holly Place, NW3 6QU
Rosslyn Hill Unitarian Chapel – Pilgrim's Place, NW3 1NG
Village Shul, synagogue, located at 27 New End, Hampstead.

St Stephen's Rosslyn Hill (Church of England) was built in 1869 by Samuel Sanders Teulon on the Pond Street side of Hampstead Green. Deconsecrated in 1978 and stripped of much of its assets it was boarded up and subsequently invaded by squatters. In 1998 it was leased to the St Stephen's Restoration and Preservation Trust which, after 11 years of fundraising and grants returned it to the community as a centre for education, weddings, public meetings and social celebrations together with occasional classical music concerts. Winning an English Heritage award for the restoration of buildings at risk, the website www.ststephenstrust.co.uk has further information.

Museums
Fenton House – Hampstead Grove, Hampstead, London, NW3 6SP
Freud Museum – 20 Maresfield Gardens, Hampstead, London, NW3 5SX
Burgh House & Hampstead Museum – New End Square, Hampstead, London, NW3 1LT
Keats House Museum – Keats Grove, Hampstead, London, NW3 2RR
Kenwood House – Hampstead Lane, Hampstead, London, NW3 7JR

Theatres and cinemas
Everyman Cinema, Hampstead – 5 Holly Bush Vale, Hampstead, London, NW3 6TX
Hampstead Theatre – Eton Avenue, Swiss Cottage, London, NW3 3EU
Pentameters Theatre – 28 Heath Street, Hampstead, London, NW3 6TE

Art Galleries 
Hampstead was once home to many art galleries but few are now left. The Catto Gallery has been in Hampstead since 1986 and has represented artists like Ian Berry, Philip Jackson, Chuck Elliott, Walasse Ting, and Sergei Chepik over the years.

 Catto Gallery - 100 Heath Street, Hampstead, London NW3 1DP
 Gilden's Art Gallery, 74, Heath Street, London NW3 1DN
 Zebra One Gallery,– 1 Perrin's Court, Hampstead, London, NW3 1QX

Public houses
Hampstead is well known for its traditional pubs, such as The Holly Bush, gas-lit until recently; the Spaniard's Inn, Spaniard's Road, where highwayman Dick Turpin took refuge; The Old Bull and Bush in North End; and The Old White Bear (formerly Ye Olde White Bear). Jack Straw's Castle, on the edge of the Heath near Whitestone Pond, has now been converted into residential flats. Others include:
The Flask – 14 Flask Walk, Hampstead, London, NW3 1HE
Freemasons Arms – 32 Downshire Hill, Hampstead, London, NW3 1NT
The Duke of Hamilton – 23–25 New End, Hampstead, London, NW3 1JD
The Horseshoe (formerly The Three Horseshoes) – 28 Heath Street, Hampstead, London, NW3 6TE
King William IV (aka KW4) – 77 Hampstead High Street, Hampstead, London, NW3 1RE
The Magdala – 2a South Hill Park, Hampstead, London, NW3 2SB
The Garden Gate – 14 South End Road, Hampstead, London, NW3 2QE
The Wells Tavern - 30 Well Walk, Hampstead, London NW3 1BX

Restaurants
Hampstead has served as a testing ground for a number of cafes and restaurants that later became successful chains. Those include Giraffe World Kitchen, Gail's and 'Bagel Street'. As a consequence, Hampstead has an eclectic mix of restaurants ranging from French to Thai. After over a decade of controversy and legal action from local residents, McDonald's was finally allowed to open in Hampstead in 1992, after winning its right in court, and agreeing to a previously unprecedented re-design of the shop front, reducing the conspicuousness of its facade and logo, It closed in November 2013. Popular local eateries also include street food vendors, such as La Creperie de Hampstead, which is often frequented by domestic and global celebrities.

Schools

Film locations

Hampstead's rural feel lends itself for use in film, a notable example being The Killing of Sister George (1968) starring Beryl Reid and Susannah York. The opening sequence has Reid's character June wandering through the streets and alleyways of Hampstead, west of Heath Street, around The Mount Square. The Marquis of Granby pub, in which June drinks at the opening of the film, was actually The Holly Bush, at 22 Holly Mount. Another example is The Collector (1965), starring Terence Stamp and Samantha Eggar, where the kidnap sequence is set in Mount Vernon.

Some scenes from An American Werewolf in London (1981) are shot on Hampstead Heath, Well Walk and Haverstock Hill.

More recently Kenwood House is the set of the "film-within-the-film" scene of Notting Hill (1999). Outdoor scenes in The Wedding Date (2005), starring Debra Messing, feature Parliament Hill Fields on the Heath, overlooking west London. Parliament Hill also features in Notes on a Scandal (2006) together with the nearby areas of Gospel Oak and Camden Town. Four Weddings and a Funeral (1994) features the old Hampstead Town Hall on Haverstock Hill. The film Scenes of a Sexual Nature (2006) was filmed entirely on Hampstead Heath, covering various picturesque locations such as the 'Floating Gardens' and Kenwood House.

A musical specifically focusing on the area, Les Bicyclettes de Belsize (1968), tells the story of a young man's cycle journey around Hampstead. After crashing into a billboard poster, he falls in love with the fashion model depicted on it. In February 2016, principal photography for Robert Zemeckis' war film Allied starring Brad Pitt and Marion Cotillard, began with the family home located on the corners of Christchurch Hill and Willow Road in Hampstead.

Cruella de Vil Mansion (Sarum Chase) is on the West Heath Road in movies 101 Dalmatians (1996.) and 102 Dalmatians (2001.)

Demography
The 2011 census showed that the population of Hampstead Town ward was 80% white (54% British, 24% Other, 2% Irish). The largest non-white group, Other Asian, claimed 4%. The religious data of the area showed that 35% was Christian, 27% irreligious and 10% Jewish. The whole town had a population of 48,858 in 2011 and includes the wards of Frognal, Hampstead Town, Belsize and Swiss Cottage.

Transport

Rail and Tube 
Hampstead station is on one transport line, the Northern Line which has connections to other lines at Camden Town and Kings Cross station among others.

The London Overground (North London line) also runs through Hampstead Heath and Finchley Road & Frognal.

Stations in Hampstead include:

 Belsize Park 
 Finchley Road  
 Finchley Road & Frognal 
 Hampstead 
 Hampstead Heath 
 Swiss Cottage 

All stations are in London fare zone 2, except Hampstead, which is in both zones 2 and 3. Hampstead station serves the north western part of the wider district, near Hampstead's traditional centre. All the other three stations in the area are located to the south.

In the 1860s, the Metropolitan and St John's Wood Railway was authorised to build a branch line from Swiss Cottage to Hampstead with its terminus to be located at the junction of Flask Walk, Well Walk and Willow Road. Financial difficulties meant that the project was cancelled in 1870.

Bus 
There is a major bus terminus near Hampstead Heath station (near the Royal Free Hospital), served by London Buses routes 24 and 168. Routes 46, 268, C11, and N5 also serve the Royal Free Hospital.

Hampstead tube station and High Street are served by routes 46, 268, 603, and N5. Route 210 runs along the northernmost rim of Hampstead, stopping at Jack Straw's Castle.

Finchley Road is served by routes 13, 113, 187, 268, C11, and N113.

Cycling 
Cycling infrastructure in Hampstead is poor. In early 2016, Transport for London (TfL) consulted with the public on a new "Cycle Superhighway" (CS11) between Swiss Cottage and the West End, which provide an unbroken, predominantly traffic-free cycle route from Hampstead to Central London. The scheme was cancelled following court action from the City of Westminster in 2018.

There are bus lanes along the A41/Finchley Road that cyclists are allowed to use.

A shared-use path runs from Parliament Hill to Jack Straw's Castle/Highgate through the centre of Hampstead Heath.

Road 
The A41/Finchley Road passes north–south through Hampstead. The road links the area directly to Marylebone and Oxford Street to the south. The route runs northbound to Golders Green, Brent Cross, the M1 motorway, and Watford.

The A502/Hampstead High Street runs from Camden Town in the south, through Hampstead, to Golders Green and Hendon in the north-west.

Nearest places
The Royal Free Hospital and A&E is in Hampstead.

Notable residents

 Hampstead has long been known as a residence of the intelligentsia, including writers, composers, ballerinas and intellectuals, actors, artists and architects – many of whom created a bohemian community in the late 19th century. After 1917, and again in the 1930s, it became base to a community of avant garde artists and writers and was host to a number of émigrés and exiles from the Russian Revolution and Nazi Europe.

Blue plaques
There are at least 60 English Heritage blue plaques in Hampstead commemorating the many diverse personalities that have lived there.

Local newspapers
The local newspapers, as of 2014, were the Hampstead and Highgate Express—known locally as the "Ham and High"—and the free Camden New Journal. The area is also home to the left-wing Labour magazine Tribune and the satirical magazine Hampstead Village Voice.

See also

The Bishops Avenue
 List of people from Hampstead

References and notes

External links

Hampstead and Marylebone by G. E. Mitton at Project Gutenberg
 The Heath and Hampstead Society
Archives relating to Hampstead at The National Archives (United Kingdom)

Images
 Images of Hampstead at the English Heritage Archive
 Images of Hampstead at the Country Life Picture Library 

 
Areas of London
Districts of the London Borough of Camden
Places formerly in Middlesex
District centres of London